Miss Dulcie from Dixie is a 1919 American silent drama film directed by Joseph Gleason and starring Gladys Leslie, Charles Kent, Arthur Donaldson, Julia Swayne Gordon, and James W. Morrison. It is based on the 1917 novel of the same name by Lulah Ragsdale. The film was released by Vitagraph Company of America on March 24, 1919.

Plot

Cast
Gladys Leslie as Dulcie Culpepper
Charles Kent as Colonel Culpepper
Arthur Donaldson as Uncle John
Julia Swayne Gordon as Aunt John
James W. Morrison as Orrin Castleton

Preservation
The film is now considered lost.

References

External links

1919 drama films
Silent American drama films
1919 films
American silent feature films
American black-and-white films
Vitagraph Studios films
Lost American films
Films based on American novels
1919 lost films
Lost drama films
1910s American films